The 1998 NCAA Division I men's lacrosse tournament was the 28th annual Division I NCAA Men's Lacrosse Championship tournament. Twelve NCAA Division I college men's lacrosse teams met after having played their way through a regular season, and for some, a conference tournament.

The championship game was played at Rutgers Stadium in front of 21,194 fans,  The game saw the Princeton University defeat University of Maryland by the score of 15–5. This is Princeton's third consecutive national championship under Head Coach Bill Tierney, and their fifth title since 1992.

Tournament bracket

 * = Overtime

All-Tournament Team
Corey Popham, Princeton (Named the tournament's Most Outstanding Player)
Christian Cook, Princeton
Jesse Hubbard, Princeton
Jon Hess, Princeton
Josh Sims, Princeton
Scott Hochstadt, Maryland
Mike Bonnani, Maryland
Brian Haggerty, Maryland
Casey Powell, Syracuse
Ryan Powell, Syracuse
Luke Parrott
Brian Woody

See also
1998 NCAA Division I Women's Lacrosse Championship
1998 NCAA Division II Lacrosse Championship
1998 NCAA Division III Men's Lacrosse Championship

References 

NCAA Division I Men's Lacrosse Championship
NCAA Division I Men's Lacrosse Championship
1998 in lacrosse
NCAA Division I men's lacrosse
Lacrosse in New Jersey